The Independent Newspaper Group (ING) is a newspaper publishing company based in Revere, Massachusetts. It publishes a number of local newspapers, serving Revere, Chelsea, Winthrop, Everett, Lynn, and many neighborhoods of Boston. It has a circulation of 76,100. , Stephen Quigley is President and majority shareholder. Joshua Resnek was an original co-founder and served as vice-president for 12 years. The other Co-founders and current shareholders are Deb DiGregorio, Cary Shuman, Maureen DiBella, Seth Daniel and John Lynds.

Holdings
ING papers include:

References

External links
 http://www.ishcc.org/MA/Revere/independent-newspaper-group-llc-the
 http://www.linkedin.com/pub/joshua-resnek/19/4a5/797
 http://www.bbb.org/boston/business-reviews/newspapers/independent-newspaper-group-llc-in-revere-ma-91987/

Newspaper companies of the United States
Newspapers published in Massachusetts
Mass media in Boston
Mass media in Essex County, Massachusetts
Mass media in Suffolk County, Massachusetts
Mass media in Middlesex County, Massachusetts